Dereiçi (Laz language: Maiskioput'e) is a village in the Kemalpaşa District, Artvin Province, Turkey. Its population is 96 (2021).

References

Villages in Kemalpaşa District
Laz settlements in Turkey